"Who's Got A Match?" is a song by the Scottish band Biffy Clyro, from their 2007 album Puzzle. It was the sixth and final single from the album with a release date of 4 February 2008. It was BBC Radio 1 DJ Colin Murray's single of the week. It debuted at number 91 in the UK Charts and rose to 60 the following week, finally reaching a peak of 27 after the CD and vinyl formats were released.

Track listings
Songs and lyrics by Simon Neil. Music by Biffy Clyro.
CD 14FLR29CD
"Who's Got A Match?" - 2:23
"Umbrella" (BBC Radio 1 Live Version) [Rihanna cover] - 2:58
7" #1 14FLR29V1
"Who's Got A Match?" - 2:23
"But I'm Serious"
7" #2 14FLR29V2
"Who's Got A Match?" - 2:23
"Cracker" - 2:28
iTunes
"Who's Got A Match? (Demo Version)" - 2:25

Video
The footage from this video was recorded during the UK Puzzle tour in November 2007. The opening clip is from Glasgow Barrowlands with the performance shots being taken from Brixton Academy, Norwich UEA and Southampton Guildhall.

References

Biffy Clyro songs
2008 singles
Songs written by Simon Neil
Song recordings produced by Garth Richardson
2007 songs
14th Floor Records singles